"Journey to the Day" was an American television play broadcast on April 22, 1960, as part of the CBS television series, Playhouse 90.  It was the 14th episode of the fourth season of Playhouse 90.

Plot
Dr. Gutera is assigned to lead group therapy at a state mental hospital. The play covers several group sessions with six patients: Katherine, a highly intelligent schizophrenic woman; Arthur, a talkative actor suffering from manic-depressive disorder; Martha, who is catatonic; Mr. Cooper, a con man sent to the asylum by the court; Billy, a delusional teenager committed to the asylum by his mother; and Helen, a housewife suffering from depression.

Production
Fred Coe was the producer. He made a pitch to produce a drama on the subject of mental health. Roger O. Hirson was hired to write the teleplay with John Bartlow Martin serving as a consultant on mental health issues. Hirson conducted research at the Columbus State Hospital in Ohio and at St. Vincent's Hospital in New York. To ensure accuracy, Hirson's script was submitted for review to the American Psychiatric Association and the National Association for Mental Health. The production required a year of production time.

John Frankenheimer was later brought in to direct. The music was composed by Jerry Goldsmith.

The cast included Steven Hill as Dr. Gutera, Mary Astor as Helen, James Dunn as Mr. Cooper, James Gregory as Dr. Endicott,  Vivian Nathan as Martha, Mike Nichols as Arthur Millman, Janice Rule as Katherine, David J. Stewart as Dr. Sobik, Peter Votrian as Billy, and Helen Kleeb as the nurse.

Due to producer Coe's obligations in Hollywood, the production was taped there.  The play was rehearsed for two weeks in New York and continued on a jet flight to California.

Reception
Cyntia Lowry of the Associated Press
Fran Swaebly of The Miami Herald found it be "too real to be real."

References

1960 American television episodes
Playhouse 90 (season 4) episodes
1960 television plays